Ahmet Eyüp Türkaslan (11 September 1994 – 7 February 2023) was a Turkish professional footballer who played as a goalkeeper.

Career
Türkaslan began his senior career with Bugsaşspor in 2013, and had a short loan at Osmanlıspor in 2016–17. He made his professional debut for Osmanlıspor in a 4–0 loss to Beşiktaş on 3 June 2017. He formally signed with Osmanlıspor, staying there for the next three seasons before moving to Ümraniyespor in 2020.

The following season, he signed a one-year contract with Yeni Malatyaspor.

Personal life and death 
Türkaslan was married.

On 6 February 2023, Türkaslan was reported to be trapped under a collapsed residential building after the 2023 Turkey–Syria earthquake. Claims that he had died were denied by the president of the club, Hacı Ahmet Yaman, who said that rescue operations were still ongoing. His wife was rescued from the rubble and asked for help on social media. She added that there were no excavators or cranes at the location. His body was recovered on 7 February 2023. He was 28 at the time of his death.

Honours
Gaziantepspor
Spor Toto Cup: 2012

References

External links
 
 
 

1994 births
2023 deaths
People from Yavuzeli
Turkish footballers
Association football goalkeepers
TFF Second League players
Süper Lig players
Gaziantepspor footballers
Ankaraspor footballers
Ümraniyespor footballers
Yeni Malatyaspor footballers
Victims of the 2023 Turkey–Syria earthquakes